Cervino is a comune (municipality) in the Province of Caserta in the Italian region Campania, located about  northeast of Naples and about  east of Caserta.

Cervino borders the following municipalities: Durazzano, Maddaloni, Santa Maria a Vico, Valle di Maddaloni.

Demographic evolution

References

Cities and towns in Campania